Brusneva Island (Ostrov Brusneva), is a small island in the Laptev Sea. It is located off the eastern side of the Lena delta in the Tiksi Bay, only 5 km ENE of Tiksi. Its length is 2.3 km and its maximum breadth less than 1 km. 
The name of this island is also spelt as "Brusnova" in some maps.

Tiksi Bay, the area where Brusneva Island lies, is subject to severe Arctic weather with frequent gales and blizzards. The sea in the bay is frozen for about nine months every year.

History
In August 1901 Russian Arctic ship Zarya headed across the Laptev Sea, searching for the legendary Sannikov Land (Zemlya Sannikova) but was soon blocked by floating pack ice in the New Siberian Islands. During 1902 the attempts to reach Sannikov Land continued while Zarya was trapped in fast ice. Leaving the ship, Russian Arctic explorer Baron Eduard Toll and three companions vanished forever in November 1902 while travelling away from Bennett Island towards the south on loose ice floes. After its ordeal in the ice, a badly-leaking Zarya was finally moored close to Brusneva Island in Bukhta Tiksi, never to leave the place again. The remaining members of the expedition returned to Saint Petersburg, while Captain Matisen went to Yakutsk.

The island was named after Russian Engineer M. I. Brusnev, a member of the Russian Arctic Expedition. Brusnev led one of the two search parties that were dispatched in the spring of 1903 in order to search for ill-fated Baron Eduard Toll. Brusnev's group searched the shores of the New Siberian Islands, while the other, led by Aleksandr Kolchak travelled by whaleboat to Bennett Island.
Brusnev found the remains of a mammoth in the island of New Siberia during his unfruitful search for Eduard Toll.

References

Geographical data
Location
Brusnev 
Monitoring of Macro-Zoobenthos in the Lena River Mouth

Islands of the Laptev Sea
Islands of the Sakha Republic